The Institute of Heraldic Consultants (IHC) of the Episcopal Conference of Slovakia (ECS) was established at the plenary session of ECS on March 10 – 11, 2008, when the Guidelines for the Creation of Heraldic Symbols (Coats of Arms) in the Roman Catholic Church and the Greek Catholic Church in Slovakia were approved. IHC is a member of the Council for Science, Education and Culture of ECS as an expert in the field of ecclesiastical heraldry. The Corps of Heraldic Consultants of the Roman and Greek Catholic Church is therefore an executive and advisory body for the design of coats of arms of parishes, deaneries, or dioceses and in practice regulates church-heraldic works in Slovakia. According to the adopted guidelines for the creation of heraldic symbols, only a coat of arms of the Church whose description (blazon) and depiction in writing has been withdrawn in writing by one of the Heraldic Consultants may be put into use. The approved coat of arms can also be registered in the Heraldic Register of the Slovak Republic, maintained by the Ministry of the Interior of the Slovak Republic, which currently represents the highest heraldic authority in Slovakia.

Heraldic Consultants of ECS 

 Dr. Ing. Zdenko G. Alexy (*9. September 1922 – † 10. January 2016)
Prof. PhDr. ThDr. Peter Zubko (* 5. October 1972)
Doc. Mgr. Ing. Miroslav Glejtek, PhD. (* 25. April 1981)

References 

Heraldic authorities
Heraldry
Heraldry and law
Ecclesiastical heraldry
Coats of arms
Episcopacy in the Catholic Church
Slovak
Catholic Church in Slovakia